Ghulam Mustafa Guard  (12 December 1925 – 13 March 1978) was an Indian cricketer who played in two Test matches from 1958 to 1960.

Ghulam Guard, 'a tall, high-shouldered man, who shuffled up to the wicket in twelve steps and ran the ball away from the right-handed batsmen at distinctly above medium pace, especially when fresh', was the first left-hander to open the bowling for India. At 6' 3", he was the tallest cricketer to play for India between Ladha Ramji in the 1930s and Abey Kuruvilla in the nineties. Guard bowled successfully in Indian domestic cricket for Bombay and Gujarat for more than 15 years from 1946 to 1947.

But he was almost 33 before he was picked for his first Test appearance, the first match against West Indies at Bombay (Mumbai) in 1958–59. He took three good wickets – John Holt (Jr), Conrad Hunte, and Gary Sobers – but was dropped for the rest of the series, and did not tour England in 1959.

Guard reappeared in the third Test against Australia in 1959–60, also at Bombay (Mumbai), but failed to take a single wicket and was again dropped. That season, his wickets, allied to a strong batting line-up, were instrumental in Bombay's winning of the Ranji Trophy, and he took nine wickets for 135 runs against Mysore in the trophy final.  He took 31 wickets in the season at an average of 15.

He went on to become the Superintendent of Police in Gujarat.

References

External links
 

1925 births
1978 deaths
India Test cricketers
Indian cricketers
Mumbai cricketers
Gujarat cricketers
Cricketers from Surat